Histerinae is a subfamily of clown beetles in the family Histeridae. There are more than 140 genera and 2,000 described species in Histerinae.

See also
 List of Histerinae genera

References

Further reading

External links

 
 

Histeridae